360 State Street is a  residential skyscraper completed in 2010 in New Haven, Connecticut. It is the second-tallest building in the city, and the largest apartment building in the state. DeSimone Consulting Engineers were the structural engineers on the building and it won the 2009 New York Construction – Top Project of the Year.

Features 

Designated a "green" building by the US Green Building Council (USGBC), it is the first residential building in Connecticut to gain Leadership in Energy and Environmental Design (LEED) Platinum status and includes a rooftop garden and a pool as well as a corner "pocket park" that may be developed as a day care center in the future. A full-scale food co-op occupies the building's ground floor. 360 State was constructed on the site where Shartenberg's Department Store stood from 1915 to 1962. The building allows pets except for the common areas of the 6th floor.

Green living 
 Connecticut's first residence targeting LEED Platinum Certification 
 1/2 the carbon footprint and utility bill of a conventional apartment 
 Energy-use web page with remote programming for each apartment
 400 kW fuel cell on site to produce clean, renewable power 
 Elevators that recapture their own energy
 Electric-car charging stations
 Zipcars available 
 Convenient first-floor storage for your bicycle
 Recycled and local construction materials
 Recycling room on each floor
 Real-time building performance data available
 Half-acre green roof with rainwater harvesting and irrigation system 
 Building-wide high-efficiency lighting and occupancy sensors
 Demand-control ventilation
 Exhaust-heat energy recovery
 Walk to over 30 Zagat-rated restaurants
 Next to State Street train station with direct access to New York. Near Union Station for travel to Boston, Hartford and Washington, DC 
 This clean energy project was made possible by a grant from the Connecticut Clean Energy Fund

References

External links 

Residential buildings completed in 2008
Buildings and structures in New Haven, Connecticut
Skyscrapers in New Haven, Connecticut
Residential skyscrapers in Connecticut
Leadership in Energy and Environmental Design platinum certified buildings
Modernist architecture in Connecticut
Apartment buildings in Connecticut